The Tian Mingjian incident (also known in Chinese as the Jian'guo Gate mass shooting) was an act of mass murder that occurred in Beijing, China on 20 September 1994, when People's Liberation Army officer First Lieutenant Tian Mingjian (Chinese: 田明建) first killed his officer and several other soldiers at his military base in Tongxian County and afterwards drove towards Jianguomen, where he continued his shooting spree and indiscriminately fired at people in the streets. 17 civilians, including an Iranian diplomat and his son, along with up to 11 soldiers and policemen were killed before Tian was finally shot dead by a police sniper.

Background
Tian Mingjian (born in 1964) was a first lieutenant stationed at an army base in Tongxian County, a suburb of Beijing. He had been in the military for over ten years, originally as a sharpshooter and was highly skilled in the military technology field. He was once promoted to regimental staff officer for military affairs.

It was reported that Tian had a quarrel with his superiors because they had forced his wife to have an abortion when she was pregnant with their second child, in accordance with China's One-child policy. Tian already had a daughter, but he came from the rural area in Henan Province, where strong traditional values emphasize siring a male child. Thus Tian secretly planned on having a son until someone in the army revealed his plan and the birth control officer forced his wife to have an abortion. By this time his wife was already seven months pregnant and died during the operation along with the unborn fetus (later discovered to be a boy).

Shooting

Army base
On 20 September Tian armed himself with a Type 81 assault rifle and killed the regimental political commissar on the drill ground. He also killed three other military officials who were trying to stop him and injured at least ten more before fleeing the military base. While his fellow soldiers were ordered to change into civilian clothing in orders to not disturb the public when searching for the deserter, Tian hijacked a jeep and headed towards Beijing. Other reports stated he boarded a bus.

Jianguomen
At 7:20 a.m., when approaching a red light in Jianguomen, the driver crashed his vehicle into a tree and tried to escape. Tian killed him, jumped out of the car and started to shoot people at random while making his way towards the embassy district. He thus killed 17 civilians, including Iranian diplomat Yousef Mohammadi Pishknari and his 9-year-old son, while another of Pishknari's sons and his daughter were wounded.

By then thousands of police were rushing to the scene and desperately tried to apprehend the gunman, but were unable to do so, since Tian was an experienced and excellent marksman. Police finally besieged Tian at Yabao Road and engaged in a gun battle with him, in which an undisclosed number of officers were killed, and a number of passers-by hit by bullets. Also a bus got caught in the line of fire, when the driver in panic stopped his vehicle, resulting in more casualties. Eventually heavy police fire forced Tian to flee into a dead end, where he was killed by a sniper.

The exact number of casualties remains unknown, though in the immediate aftermath 14 people were reported dead, and 72 others wounded, many of them so severely that doctors expected the death toll to rise to 40 or 50. The newspaper Lien Ho Pao reported on 7 December the same year that 15 people were killed, among them six servicemen, and 60 others were wounded.

Aftermath
When Canadian television began to report live about the shooting at the embassy district, satellite transmission was immediately turned off by the Chinese government and further reporting, including on-site interviews, were prohibited.

Shortly after the shooting, the Beijing Garrison Command (BGC) was ordered by the Central Military Commission to conduct a thorough review of the incident. The investigation was organized by the People's Liberation Army's General Staff Headquarters and the General Political Department and headed by Zhang Zhen, then vice chairman of the Central Military Commission.

Due to the investigation the commander of the Beijing Military Region, Lieutenant General Li Laizhu, and its political commissar, Lieutenant General Gu Shanqing, were given serious warnings as a disciplinary sanction and serious demerits within the party. It also resulted in the dismissal and demeriting of BGC commander Major General Liu Fengjun and BGC political commissar Major General Yang Huichuan, who were then replaced by He Daoquan and Zhang Baokang. Additionally the commander and political commissar of the Third Guards Division, as well as the commander of the 12th Regiment and all battalion commanders and instructors under his command, were dismissed while several military officials of the Political Department of the Beijing Military Region, and the Beijing Garrison Headquarters and Political Department were punished. In total, about 60 military officials were punished, demerited, or dismissed as a consequence of the shooting.

Furthermore, the Third Guards Division of the Beijing Garrison was transferred from Beijing to a remote border post, and a general order was issued to the entire army by the Central Military Commission Headquarters to strictly carry out weaponry management system and to strengthen ideological work.

Others have been awarded for their handling of the shooting, among them an official who directed Tian's interception and the sharpshooter who killed the gunman.

References

External links
 Do Family Connections Matter in the People’s Liberation Army in China?
 Beijing Officer Accused
 China's Elite Politics
 China - Rush-hour shootout, Associated Press (September 20, 1994) (Video)

Mass murder in 1994
Spree shootings in China
People's Liberation Army
Deaths by firearm in China
History of Beijing
1990s in Beijing
Crime in Beijing
1994 in military history
September 1994 events in Asia
Abortion in China
1994 murders in China
20th-century mass murder in China